Macroglossum adustum is a moth of the  family Sphingidae. It is known from the Solomon Islands.

References

Macroglossum
Moths described in 1916